Marvin Stephens Arrington Sr. (born February 10, 1941) is an American judge in the Superior Court of Fulton County, Georgia and a former politician in the city of Atlanta.  Elected to the Atlanta Board of Aldermen in 1969 (a precursor to the present-day City Council), he served as President of the Atlanta City Council for 17 years until his unsuccessful bid for mayor in 1997.  Arrington was one of the first two black students to undertake full-time studies at the Emory University School of Law in 1965.  He presently serves on the Emory Board of Trustees.

Early years
Arrington was born in Grady Hospital in Atlanta, Georgia and has resided in Atlanta all his life. His father, George Arrington, was a truck driver and his mother, Maggie, was employed as a domestic worker. He grew up in the Grady Homes public housing project in downtown Atlanta.

Education 
Arrington graduated from Henry McNeal Turner High School in 1959 and went on to attend Clark College (now Clark Atlanta University) on a football scholarship. He graduated from Clark in 1963 with a bachelor of arts degree in sociology and was a member of Kappa Alpha Psi fraternity. In 1964, he began his legal studies at Howard University, but transferred to Emory University School of Law after his first year.  He graduated with his juris doctor degree from Emory in 1967.

Career
From 1969 Arrington was for 25 years on the Atlanta Board of Aldermen (later Atlanta City Council), including 7 years as president.

In 1973, Arrington joined Kleiner and Herman, later with other Kleiner and Herman partners formed Arrington, Winter, Krischer and Goger.

In 1989 Arrington and Donald Hollowell formed Arrington and Hollowell, specializing in corporate bonds, labor relations, litigation and worker's compensation.

In 1997 he ran, unsuccessfully, for mayor, against incumbent Bill Campbell.

In 2002 he was appointed judge in the Fulton County Superior Court by the governor, Roy Barnes and was elected for a full term in November. Judge Arrington declared Georgia's hate crime law unconstitutional, his decision was later upheld by the Supreme Court of the State of Georgia.

In 2005 he was in the Fulton court house when Rowland Barnes was shot, and was in lockdown in his office with a number of court staff.

In 2008 he was subject of some controversy when he cleared his courtroom of white people (notably lawyers), to speak to those present, primarily defendants.  Later he summed up what he said as "Don't violate the law, make something out of yourself, go to school, find a role model, somebody that will help you advance your life."  He said that "In retrospect, it was a mistake," and that he would  shortly deliver the same speech to everyone.

Awards and recognition
Arrington was voted one of Atlanta's top 25 lawyers by Atlanta Magazine.  Black Enterprise Magazine included Arrington and Hollowell in their list of America's "Top 10 Black Law Firms".

Personal life
Arrington married Marilyn Jones in 1971.  They have a son and a daughter, both lawyers.

Published works
 Making My Mark: The Story of a Man Who Wouldn't Stay in His Place, autobiography, 2008, Mercer University Press

References

External links
Marvin S. Arrington Papers at the Stuart A. Rose Manuscript, Archives, and Rare Book Library

Georgia (U.S. state) state court judges
Emory University School of Law alumni
Living people
1941 births
African-American lawyers
Atlanta City Council members
Writers from Atlanta
African-American city council members in Georgia (U.S. state)
21st-century African-American people
20th-century African-American people